Raleigh Athletic Football Club was an English association football club. It competed in the FA Cup from 1948 to 1955.

References

Defunct football clubs in Nottinghamshire
Works association football teams in England